Roger Delaney (born 27 February 1966) is a former Australian rules footballer who played for Fitzroy in the Australian Football League (AFL) in 1990. He was recruited from the Port Adelaide Football Club in the South Australian National Football League (SANFL) with the 23rd selection in the 1989 VFL Draft.

Playing career
For the 2011 season he became the coach of the Maroochy/North Shore Australian Football Club in the Queensland Australian Football League on the Sunshine Coast, Queensland.

Family
Delaney is married to Jacqui Delaney, the former Australia netball international. They have three children, Yasmine (b. 1998) and twins Cooper and Jada (born c. 2006). The Delaneys settled in Sydney and then the Sunshine Coast. They live and work in the Coolum Beach/Peregian Beach/Noosa district.

References

External links

Living people
1966 births
Fitzroy Football Club players
Port Adelaide Football Club (SANFL) players
Port Adelaide Football Club players (all competitions)
Australian rules footballers from South Australia
Australian rules football coaches